The Travels to the West of Qiu Changchun was a record of the journey embarked by the Taoist monk Qiu Chuji who traveled from Shandong through Central Asia to present himself before Genghis Khan.

In 1220, on the invitation of Genghis Khan with a golden tablet, Qiu Chuji left his hometown in Shandong with nineteen disciples, and travelled through Beijing and travelled north. In June, they reached Dexing (德興; present-day Julu Hebei) and stayed in the Longyang Taoist Temple (龍陽觀) from summer to end of winter. On February 1221, they resumed their journey. When asked by friends and disciples when to expect the master to return, the master answered "In three years, three years". On February 3, they reached Cuiping Pass (翠帡口; west of Zhangjiakou), they saw the Taihang Mountains to their south. Travelling north then north east, they arrived at Gailipo salt lake (蓋里泊; now named Jiuliancheng Naoer 九連城淖爾; in the south of the Taibus Banner).  From there they went to Lake Buir, Hulunbuir, Ulan Bator, Arkhangai, Altay Mountains, Beshbalik, Dzungaria, Samarkand and arrived at Hindu Kush of Afghanistan in 1222 and presented himself before Genghis Khan. 

The journey to Persia and back took three years, from 1220 to 1224. The record was written by a disciple Li Zhichang (李志常), who accompanied Qiu on the journey. The Travels consisted of two parts, the first part described the details of the travel to the west and back; the second part contains advice from Qiu Chuji to Genghis Khan.

The Travels was published by another disciple Sun Xi (孫錫), with a preface dated 1228. The Travels was included in Dao Zang (道藏 Depository of Taoist works), but was forgotten for more than five hundred years until 1795 Qing dynasty scholars Qian Daxin and Duan Yucai rediscovered it from Dao Zang in the Xuanmiao Taoist Temple (玄妙觀) in Suzhou. Qian Daxin then hand copied this work and distributed it.

Translations
The Travels was first translated into Russian by the Archimandrite of Russian Orthodox Church Pekin Eccles Mission Palladius Kafarov in 1866.
 
In 1867 M. Pauthier translated an abridged version of the Travels from Hai Guo Tu Zhi

1888,  Dr. Emil Bretschneider, a Baltic German physician posted to the Russian Legation in Beijing, published his English translation of the Travels.

In popular culture

A 2013 Chinese film, An End to Killing, is a rendition of this story.

References

History of Taoism
Taoist texts